Janusz Kołodziej (born 27 May 1984 in Tarnów, Poland) is a Polish speedway rider who has ridden for the Polish national team and is a four times champion of Poland.

Career
Kołodziej rode in Britain for the Reading Racers in 2003 and from 2006 to 2007.

In July 2018, during the Speedway Grand Prix Qualification he won the GP Challenge, which ensured that he claimed a permanent slot for the 2019 Speedway Grand Prix.

In 2019, he won his fourth Polish title, he had previously been the Polish champion in 2005, 2010 and 2013.

Speedway Grand Prix results

Career
 Individual World Championship (Speedway Grand Prix)
 2006 – 29th place (0 point as track reserve)
 Speedway World Cup
 2004 – 4th place (10 points)
 2006 – 5th place (2 points in Race-Off)
 Team U-21 World Championship
 2005 – World Champion (14 points)
 Individual European Championship
 2004 – finalist
 Individual U-19 European Championship
 2003 – Silver medal
 European Pairs Championship
 2005 – European Champion (4 points)
 European Club Champions' Cup
 2006 – European Champion (14 points)
 Individual Polish Championship
 2002 – injury in Semi-Final A (5th place in Quarter-Final B – qualification to Semi-Final)
 2003 – 12 place in Semi-Final B
 2005 – Polish Champion (15 points)
 2006 – injury (8th place in Semi-Final B – qualification to Final
 Individual U-21 Polish Championship
 2001 – 16th place (0 point)
 2002 – Bronze medal (11+2 points)
 2003 – 5th place (11 points)
 2004 – Polish Champion (13 points)
 2005 – Silver medal (13 points)
 Polish Pairs Speedway Championship
 2001 – 6th place in Semi-Final (2 points)
 2002 – 3rd place in Semi-Final C (0 heat as reserve)
 2003 – 3rd place in Semi-Final C (7 points)
 2004 – Silver medal (1 point)
 2005 – 3rd place in Semi-Final C (13 points) 2007 – Polish Champion (0 point)
 Polish Under-21 Pairs Championship
 2001 – 6th place in Semi-Final A (9 points) 2002 – 6th place (12 points)
 2003 – 6th place (15 points)
 2004 – Polish Champion (17 points)
 2005 – Silver medal (14 points)
 Polish Team Championship
 2000 – 2nd place in Second League with Unia Tarnów 2001 – 1st place in Second League with Unia Tarnów 2002 – 5th place in First League with Unia Tarnów 2003 – 2nd place in First League with Unia Tarnów 2004 – Polish Champion with Unia Tarnów
 2005 – Polish Champion with Unia Tarnów
 2006 – 4th place with Unia Tarnów
 2007 – 6th place with Unia Tarnów
 Polish Under-21 Team Championship
 2000 – 3rd place in Qualification Group C 2001 – 2nd place in Qualification Group D 2002 – 2nd place in Qualification Group C 2003 – 2nd place in Qualification Group B 2004 – Bronze medal (started in Qualification Group B) 2005 – Silver medal (10 points)
 Golden Helmet
 2005 – Winner (14 points)
 2006 – injury (qualification to Final) 2007 – 17th place (0 point as track reserve)
 Silver Helmet (U-21)
 2001 – 7th place (9 points)
 2003 – Silver medal (13 points)
 2004 – injury (2nd place in Semi-Final B – qualification to Final''
 2005 – Winner (13 points)
 Bronze Helmet (U-19)
 2001 – 6th place (9 points)
 2003 – Winner (15 points)

See also
Poland national speedway team
List of Speedway Grand Prix riders

References

External links
(pl) Official Site

1984 births
Living people
Polish speedway riders
Team Speedway Junior World Champions
European Pairs Speedway Champions
Polish speedway champions
Reading Racers riders
Sportspeople from Tarnów